is a singles collection album released by Rimi Natsukawa on .

Contents

The album features Natsukawa's first seven singles with Victor Entertainment, along with seven B-sides from these singles. For "Yūbae ni Yurete," "Hana ni Naru" and "Tori yo," this is the first album release that they have appeared.

Natsukawa's single  does not feature on the single collection, despite being released a month before it.

Track listing

Japan sales rankings

References

Rimi Natsukawa albums
2005 compilation albums
Victor Entertainment compilation albums